Still on My Way to Hollywood is a volume of autobiography written by Ernie Wise, co-written by Trevor Barnes and published by Duckworth in 1990. The title refers both to the author's well-known positive outlook (he was 64 years old at the time) and the limited feature film success enjoyed by the enduring stage and television double act Morecambe and Wise.

British autobiographies
1990 non-fiction books